Robert Hense (17 November 1885, Cologne – 20 June 1966) was a German international footballer.

References

1885 births
1966 deaths
Association football defenders
German footballers
Germany international footballers
Footballers from Cologne
Place of death missing